Cunnington is a surname. Notable people with the surname include:

Adam Cunnington, English footballer
Ben Cunnington (archaeologist), British archaeologist
Ben Cunnington (footballer), Australian rules footballer
Cecil Willett Cunnington, British collector and historian of costume
Douglas Cunnington, Canadian politician
Eddie Cunnington, Scottish footballer
Maud Cunnington, British archaeologist
Phillis Emily Cunnington, British collector and historian of costume
Shaun Cunnington, English footballer and football manager
William Cunnington, British antiquarian
William Alfred Cunnington British zoologist